The Battle of Łódź took place from 11 November to 6 December 1914, near the city of Łódź in Poland. It was fought between the German Ninth Army and the Russian First, Second, and Fifth Armies, in harsh winter conditions.  The Germans redeployed their Ninth Army around Thorn, so as to threaten the Russian northern flank, following German reversals after the Battle of the Vistula River.  The German objective was to prevent an invasion of Germany, and thus considered a success, though narrowly avoiding disaster.

Background
Grand Duke Nicholas Nikolayevich favored Nikolai Ruzsky's plan to invade Silesia on 14 November, with the Russian Second, Fifth, and Fourth Armies.  The Russian Tenth and First Armies maintained pressure on East Prussia, while the Eighth Army pressed against the Carpathian passes, the Eleventh besieged Przemyśl, and the Third army advanced on Krakow.  Hindenburg and Ludendorff had moved the German Ninth Army to the Thorn area, in an attempt to defend Silesia.  The Ninth Army consisted of the XI, XVII, and XX Corps, plus the 3rd Guards Infantry Division, and the I Reserve and XXV Reserve Corps from the Eighth Army.  Four divisions of the Austro-Hungarian Second Army took over the German Ninth Army's former positions, the remainder of Second Army troops then came under the command of the Austro-Hungarian Third army.  The Germans had placed 15 infantry divisions, and 5 cavalry divisions, under Mackensen's Ninth Army in its drive on Łódź.  However, the German advance faced 24 Russian infantry divisions and 8 cavalry divisions.  The Scheidemann's Russian Second army was deployed around Łódź, with his IV, I and XXIII Corps on the Warta, and his II Corps at Łęczyca.  Rennenkampf's Russian First  Army was deployed further east, along the Vistula.

On 1 November, Paul von Hindenburg was appointed commander of the two German armies on the Eastern Front.  His Eighth Army was defending East Prussia. Knowing Silesia would be invaded on 14 November, Hindenburg and Ludendorff decided not to meet the attack head-on, but to seize the initiative by shifting their Ninth Army north by railway to the border south of the German fortress at Thorn, where they were reinforced with two corps transferred from Eighth Army.  The enlarged Ninth Army would then attack the Russian right flank, cutting Łódź off from Warsaw, and eliminating any troops thus encircled.  In ten days Ninth Army was moved north by running 80 trains every day.

Battle

On 11 November, Mackensen's German Ninth Army I and XXV Reserve Corps struck at the V Siberia Corps of Rennenkampf's First Army, located near Włocławek on the left bank of the Vistula, before they could prepare defensive positions.  The German XX Corps advanced on Lubraniec so as to attack the V Siberian Corps flank.  Rennenkampf was refused permission to send his VI Siberian Corps from Wyszogród to the aid of the V Siberian Corps, who had to retreat.  On 12 November, a gap formed between the Russian II and V Siberian Corps, as the V Siberian Corps was forced to retreat to the southeast, which Mackensen took advantage of on 13 November. On 14 November, Mackensen ordered his entire German Ninth Army to advance, with his XI Corps attacking the Russian XXIII Corps northern flank, his XVII and XX Corps engaging the Russian II Corps, and his I Reserve Corps was to capture Łowicz, while containing the VI Siberian Corps.  Yet, the Russians were still unaware of the German force attacking them, as they started their invasion of Silesia.  On 15 November, the Germans captured Kutno, and on 16 November, crossed the Bzura, while Scheidemann ordered his Russian I and IV Corps to retreat towards Łódź.  As the German XX Corps captured Stryków, the XXV Reserve Corps captured Brzeziny on 18 November, while XX and XVII engaged the defenses of Łódź.  The Russian Fifth Army's XIX and V Corps were ordered north to Skierniewice, in support of Second Army's left flank.  It was Plehve's Russian Fifth Army which prevented German encirclement of Łódź from the south.  In the interim, Rennenkampf's Russian First Army remained stationary, content to guard the approach to Warsaw.

Grand Duke Nicholas's primary objective was saving Second Army and avoiding a repeat of the disaster at Tannenberg. On 16 November he ordered Wenzel von Plehve's Russian Fifth Army to abandon the proposed offensive into Silesia and to move northward towards  Łódź; they marched  in only two days. As soon as Hindenburg saw the transcript of this order, he knew that his maneuver had succeeded. Now seven Russian corps were defending the city.

By 19 November, the Germans were facing a numerically superior Russian force, with the intention of the Russians to attack the German penetration east of Łódź on 21 November.  Yet, Mackensen still ordered his XX and XXV Reserve Corps to continue their effort to outflank the Russian Łódź defenses.  The Germans made little progress on 20 November.  On 21 November, a group commanded by Vladimir Slyusarenko in Rennenkampf's Russian First Army, advanced from Łowicz towards Bielawy and Strykow, in an attempt to close the  gap between the Russian First and Second Armies. Slyusarenko's force consisted of the 43rd Infantry Division, the 6th Siberian Infantry Division, and 3 additional brigades. Only the German 19th Dragoon Regiment opposed this Russian threat to Friedrich von Scholtz's XX Corps rear, whose front faced southwest, south, and east.

The German Ninth Army's right wing was XXV Reserve Corps, commanded by Lieutenant General Reinhard von Scheffer-Boyadel, a 63-year-old who had been recalled from retirement. With Lieutenant General Manfred von Richthofen's, great uncle of the flying ace, cavalry in the van, they were pushing southeast between Łódź and the Vistula. Part of Rennenkampf's First Army was finally moving east to attack the Germans. Once over they attacked the weakly defended side of the corridor extending south from the German frontier to their advancing spearhead. The Russians reoccupied Brzeziny, cutting the roads used by German XXV Reserve Corps, whose progress south was now blocked by the Russian Fifth Army. Scheffer was ordered to stop advancing, but the order did not reach him. Suddenly it was the Germans who were ensnared in a pocket. Mackensen stopped attacking toward Łódź, turning to help to extricate them. The ecstatic Russians ordered trains for up to 20,000 prisoners, actually the German fighting strength in the pocket was about 11,000, but there were also 3,000 wounded. Other sources state that 50,000 prisoners were anticipated.

Hindenburg was alarmed by the intercepted wireless messages ordering the trains, but Mackensen assured him that they would prevail.  In the pocket, Richthofen's cavalry, which had been leading the advance, reversed direction to screen the rear of three infantry columns Scheffer formed along the roads for the retreat back northwest. The frozen, hungry Germans pushed on through the icy night.  They reached the outskirts of Breziny unobserved, because most of the 6th Siberian Division were huddling in their sleeping quarters, trying to keep from freezing.  The Germans attacked at dawn with bayonets on unloaded rifles and occupied much of the town before a shot was fired. The commander of 6th Siberian Division, Gennings, broke down. Swamped with conflicting accounts of German movements, and with the weather too foggy and the days too short for aerial observation,  Ruzsky issued a series of orders, each contradicting the one before.

Scheffer's left column, led by Karl Litzmann's 3rd Guards Infantry Division, had reached Breziny on the morning of 24 November. Litzmann wrote, on the retreat through Gałków Mały beforehand, "...the sleeping Russians were hauled out of the houses and taken prisoner." Litzmann led the "overwhelming and sudden" attack on Breziny, of which, "The success reinvigorated us," he later wrote.  According to Buttar, "The confusion in command was widespread throughout the Russian formations involved in the fighting.  It seems that the moves by Mackensen to aid the breakout by directing elements of XX Corps and I Reserve Corps to attack the encircling Russians distracted many local commanders, who directed their troops into positions from where they could cover any new German advance from the north, rather than a breakout from the encirclement."  Scheffer's central column was led by Thiesenhausen's 49th Reserve Division messaged Scheffer, "There is no doubt: if we don't get through today, we will all be left lying on this ground, or will be en route for Siberia."  By the end of the day, all three of Scheffer's columns were united in Brzeziny, including the right column consisting of Hans von der Goltz's 50th Reserve Division.  In the words of Buttar, "It was the end of the encirclement of Scheffer's command."

Scheffer's XXV Reserve Corps was able to link up with the German XX Corps, when the Alexei Churin's Russian II Corps abandoned Strykow.  Scheffer's men had escaped with their wounded, 12,000 Russian prisoners, and 64 captured Russian guns.

Inconclusive fighting continued until 29 November when at a conference with his front commanders Grand Duke Nicholas ordered his forces in Poland to withdraw to defensible lines nearer to Warsaw.
Hindenburg learned from an intercepted wireless that Łódź was to be evacuated.  The Germans moved in on 6 December, occupying a major industrial city with a population of more than 500,000 (about 70% of the population of Warsaw).  German casualties were 35,000, while Russian losses were 70,000 plus 25,000 prisoners and 79 guns.

Aftermath
Mackensen, Scheffer and Litzmann were awarded the Pour le Mérite, while Litzmann earned the nickname 'the Lion of Brzeziny'.  According to Buttar, "The encirclement of XXV Reserve Corps was broken for several reasons: lack of coordination by First, Second, and Fifth Armies; the extraordinary muddle of command in the Lowicz detachment; and Ruzsky's oscillation between his deep-rooted caution and his almost impulsive issuing of orders for all-out attacks." For the Russian Army, Łódź became the furthest point of advance towards Germany's heartland.  Ruzsky retreated to a defensive line along the Bzura and Rawka rivers.

Hindenburg summed it up: "In its rapid changes from attack to defense, enveloping to being enveloped, breaking through to being broken through, this struggle reveals a most confusing picture on both sides.  A picture which in its mounting ferocity exceeded all the battles that had previously been fought on the Eastern front!" The Polish winter bought a lull to the major fighting.  A Russian invasion of Silesia must wait for spring.  By this time, the Russians feared the German army, which seemed to appear from nowhere and to win despite substantial odds against them, while the Germans regarded the Russian army with "increasing disdain." Hindenburg and Ludendorff were convinced that if sufficient troops were transferred from the Western Front, they could force the Russians out of the war.

Order of Battle

Central Powers Forces 
[North to South]
9th Army [as of Nov. 11, 1914] – Gen. August von Mackensen
Corps "Thorn" – Gen. Gustaf von Dickhuth-Harrach
99th Reserve Infantry Brigade (from 50th Reserve Infantry Division)
21st Landwehr Infantry Brigade
Brigade "Westernhagen" (Landwehr & Landsturm)
XXV Reserve Corps
49th Reserve Infantry Division
100th Reserve Infantry Brigade (from 50th Reserve Infantry Division)
I Reserve Corps
1st Reserve Infantry Division
36th Reserve Infantry Division
HKK 1 – Gen. Manfred von Richtofen
6th Cavalry Division
9th Cavalry Division
XX Corps
37th Infantry Division
41st Infantry Division
XVII Corps
35th Infantry Division
36th Infantry Division
XI Corps
22nd Infantry Division
38th Infantry Division
HKK 3 – Gen. Rudolf Ritter von Frommel
5th Cavalry Division
8th Cavalry Division
Austrian 7th Cavalry Division
Landsturm Brigade "Doussin" (part of Corps "Posen")
In reserve: 3rd Guards Infantry Division
Reinforcements:
Arrived starting mid-November:
Approximately 5 towed foot artillery battalions with 10 batteries of 21 cm heavy howitzers plus 1 Austro-Hungarian 30.5 cm siege howitzer battery (from the eastern fortresses and the west) 
Mid-November:
Corps "Posen" (four weak brigades composed of Landwehr, Ersatz and Landsturm troops) – Gen. Fritz Wilhelm von Hernhaußen
End of November:
II Corps (from the west)
3rd Infantry Division (later one brigade transferred to Corps "Gerok")
4th Infantry Division
Corps "Gerok"
48th Reserve Infantry Division (from the west)
Corps "Breslau" (later added to Corps "Gerok")
Division "Menges"
Brigade "Schmiedecke"
1st Infantry Division (from I Corps of 8th Army in East Prussia)
4th Cavalry Division (from southern part of the East Prussian front)
Beginning of December:
Corps "Fabek" (from the west)
26th Infantry Division
25th Reserve Infantry Division
III Reserve Corps (from the west)
5th Reserve Infantry Division
6th Reserve Infantry Division
Mid-December:
1st Guard Reserve Infantry Division (from Army "Woyrsch")

Russian Forces
Northwestern Front – Gen. Ruzsky

1st Army – Gen. Paul von Rennenkampf (from 2 Dec. Gen. Alexander Litvinov)
I Turkestan Corps
11th Siberian Rifle Division
1st Turkestan Rifle Brigade
2nd Turkestan Rifle Brigade
V Siberian Corps
50th Infantry Division
79th Infantry Division
VI Corps
4th Infantry Division
16th Infantry Division
VI Siberian Corps
13th Siberian Rifle Division
14th Siberian Rifle Division
Combined Cossack Division
Guard Cossack Division
4th Don Cossack Division
6th Cavalry Division
Ussuri Mounted Brigade
Reinforcements:
II Corps (from 2nd Army)
6th Siberian Rifle Division (from 10th Army)
55th Infantry Division (from army reserve)
67th Infantry Division (from army reserve)
63rd Reserve Division (half) (from Warsaw fortified area)
3rd Turkestan Rifle Brigade
Rifle Officers’ School Regiment (from Warsaw fortified area)
2nd Army – Gen. Sergei Scheidemann
I Corps
22nd Infantry Division
24th Infantry Division
II Corps
26th Infantry Division
43rd Infantry Division
II Siberian Corps
4th Siberian Rifle Division
5th Siberian Rifle Division
IV Corps
30th Infantry Division
40th Infantry Division
XXIII Corps
3rd Guard Infantry Division
1st Rifle Brigade
one brigade of 2nd Infantry Division
Cavalry Corps "Novikov"
5th Cavalry Division
8th Cavalry Division
14th Cavalry Division
Caucasus Cavalry Division
Reinforcements in Dec:
2nd Cavalry Division (from 10th Army)
62nd Reserve Division (from army reserve)
5th Army – Gen. Pavel Plehve
I Siberian Corps
1st Siberian Rifle Division
2nd Siberian Rifle Division
V Corps
5th Infantry Division
10th Infantry Division
XIX Corps
17th Infantry Division
38th Infantry Division
5th Don Cossack Division
Turkmen Cossack Brigade

References

Further reading
Tucker, Spencer The Great War: 1914–18 (1998)
Wulffen, Karl von, and P. B. Harm. The Battle of Lodz. Washington, D.C.: s.n., 1932.

External link

Conflicts in 1914
Lodz 1914
Lodz 1914
Lodz 1914
20th century in Łódź
Piotrków Governorate
1914 in Poland
November 1914 events
December 1914 events
World War I orders of battle
History of Łódź Voivodeship
Military history of Poland